P. A. Antony (1936-1996) was an Indian National Congress politician from Thrissur City. He was the Member of Parliament from Thrissur Lok Sabha constituency, Kerala, in 1984 and 1989.

References

Politicians from Thrissur
Indian National Congress politicians from Kerala
India MPs 1984–1989
India MPs 1989–1991
Lok Sabha members from Kerala
1936 births
1996 deaths